The United States presidential election debates were held during the 1996 presidential election. Two debates were held between Republican candidate, Senate Majority Leader Bob Dole and Democratic incumbent President Bill Clinton, the major candidates. One debate was held with their vice presidential running mates, Jack Kemp and Al Gore. All three debates were sponsored by the non-profit Commission on Presidential Debates (CPD), which has organized presidential debates since its establishment in 1987.

The vice presidential debate was held on October 9 at the Mahaffey Theater. The presidential debates were held on October 6 at The Bushnell and October 16 at University of San Diego, ahead of the November 7 Election Day. Jim Lehrer moderated each of the presidential debates. In each of the first two debates, the candidates received questioned in turn with two minutes to answer and a 60-second rebuttal. The third and final debate featured a town hall meeting format.

Debate schedule

Participant selection
In 1996, the following six candidates achieved ballot access in enough states to mathematically win the election via the Electoral College:

Unlike in 1992, Ross Perot was excluded from the debates in the 1996 campaign. Paul Kirk, co-chairman of the Commission on Presidential Debates stated that "Our decision, was made on the basis that only President Clinton and Senator Dole have a realistic chance, as set forth in our criteria, to be elected the next president of the United States."

Only Senate Majority Leader Bob Dole and President Bill Clinton met the CPD selection criteria for any of the presidential debates. As a result, only Jack Kemp and Al Gore met the criteria for the vice presidential debate.

1996 was originally to have 3 presidential debates, the first one on Wednesday, September 25 at Washington University in St. Louis; it was canceled by both campaigns.

October 6: First presidential debate (The Bushnell Center for the Performing Arts)
The Debate was held in the Bushnell Center for the Performing Arts in Hartford, Connecticut.

Jim Lehrer of PBS' The NewsHour posed the questions for each candidate.

Transcript
Debate transcript from the Commission on Presidential Debates website.

Viewership
An estimated 46.1 million viewers tuned into the debates.

October 9: Vice presidential debate (Mahaffey Theater)
The Debate was held in the Mahaffey Theater in St. Petersburg, Florida.

Jim Lehrer of PBS' The NewsHour posed the questions for each candidate.

Transcript
Debate transcript from the Commission on Presidential Debates website.

Viewership
An estimated 26.6 million viewers tuned into the debate.

October 16: Second presidential debate (University of San Diego)

The debate was held at the Shiley Theater on the campus of University of San Diego in San Diego, California

Jim Lehrer of PBS' The NewsHour moderated the town hall style debate featuring the questions asked by members of the audience:

Transcript
Debate transcript from the Commission on Presidential Debates website.

Viewership
An estimated 36.3 million viewers tuned into the debate.

Third-party debates 

October 7, 1996 - C-SPAN sponsored a third-party presidential debate moderated by Jennifer Laszlo. In attendance for this debate were Libertarian candidate Harry Browne, Constitution Party candidate Howard Phillips, and Natural Law Party candidate John Hagelin. Ross Perot declined the invitation to attend.
October 23, 1996 - C-SPAN sponsored a third-party presidential debate moderated by Bill Shen. In attendance for this debate were Libertarian candidate Harry Browne, Constitution Party candidate Howard Phillips, and Natural Law Party candidate John Hagelin. Ross Perot declined the invitation to attend.

References

External links 
 October 7 Third Party Debate
 October 23 Third Party Debate
 Open Debates 

1996
Debates